is a guitarist who has performed with Japanese rock bands such as The Blue Hearts, The High-Lows and The Cro-Magnons. He was born in Hino and raised in Kodaira in Tokyo, Japan.

His nickname while playing was "Mashi."

Solo albums
Natsu no Nukegara (November 21, 1989)
Happy Songs (April 10, 1991)
Raw Life (November 1, 1992)
Hito ni wa Sorezore Jijō ga Aru (October 21, 1994)
Raw Life -Revisited- (April 25, 2007)

References

The Blue Hearts members
Japanese rock guitarists
Punk rock guitarists
Japanese punk rock musicians
Musicians from Tokyo
People from Hino, Tokyo
People from Kodaira, Tokyo
1962 births
Living people